Black Creek Wilderness is a  wilderness area in the U.S. state of Mississippi.  Located within the De Soto National Forest, Mississippi's largest wilderness lies in the broad valley of Black Creek, stained a deep caramel color by the tannic acid of decaying vegetation.  The upland areas protect significant areas of longleaf pine forest, while the river creates bottomland hardwoods and shorelines with sand bars. It is therefore an important representation of typical coastal plain ecosystems that existed before forests were cleared and the rivers dammed. The Pascagoula River is nationally significant as one of the largest unimpeded rivers remaining in the lower 48 states.  Rare species include the Pearl darter and the Yellow-blotched map turtle, both found only in this river and its tributaries. This wilderness area is surrounded by De Soto National Forest, which is also one of the nation's most important areas of coastal plain ecosystems.

Wild and Scenic River
Black Creek, a tributary of the Pascagoula River, is Mississippi's only designated National Wild and Scenic River.  Designated in 1986,  of the creek are classified as "scenic."

Black Creek bisects Black Creek Wilderness, creating a hardwood floodplain of oxbow lakes and thick stands of sweet gum, sweet bay, red maple, oak, pine, and bald cypress. These represent the sort of forests that form when natural levels of water, including spring flooding and summer drought, control the distribution of species.

See also
 List of U.S. Wilderness Areas
 Wilderness Act

References

External links
 Black Creek Wilderness - Wilderness.net
 Black Creek Wilderness, Mississippi - GORP
 Black Creek Wilderness - Backpacker.com

IUCN Category Ib
Protected areas of Perry County, Mississippi
Wilderness areas of Mississippi
De Soto National Forest